Heteroclinus puellarum, the little weedfish, is a species of clinid found on the Indian Ocean coast of southern Australia where it can be found in tide pools, rocky reefs and estuaries.  This species can reach a maximum length of  TL.

References

puellarum

Fish described in 1955